Tower Hill may refer to:

Places
Australia
 Tower Hill (volcano),  Victoria, Australia
 Tower Hill Wildlife Reserve, Victoria, Australia
Belize
 Tower Hill, Belize, a village in Orange Walk District

Sierra Leone
 Tower Hill (Sierra Leone), a neighborhood in Freetown

United Kingdom
 Tower Hill, an elevated spot outside the Tower of London
 Tower Hill Memorial, a war memorial on Tower Hill in London
 Tower Hill tube station, a London Underground station situated at Tower Hill on the District Line
 Tower Hill, Cheshire, a location
 Tower Hill, Devon, a location
 Tower Hill railway station (Devon), a former station
 Tower Hill, Essex, a location
 Tower Hill, Hertfordshire, a location
 Tower Hill, Merseyside, a location
 Tower Hill, Surrey, a location
 Tower Hill, West Midlands, an area of Great Barr, Birmingham
 Tower Hill, West Sussex, a location
 Tower Hill (Abergele), in Abergele, North Wales

United States
 Tower Hill, Illinois, a village
 Tower Hill Park, in Minneapolis, Minnesota
 Tower Hill Township, Shelby County, Illinois

Other uses 
 Tower Hill (Staten Island Railway station)
 Tower Hill Botanic Garden, in Boylston, Massachusetts, United States
 Tower Hill School, in Wilmington, Delaware, United States
 Tower Hill State Game Reserve, in Victoria, Australia